The Berry Peaks are a small group of peaks  south of the terminus of Reedy Glacier, between the southeast edge of the Ross Ice Shelf and the Watson Escarpment. They were mapped by the United States Geological Survey from ground surveys and from U.S. Navy air photos, 1960–63, and named by the Advisory Committee on Antarctic Names (US-ACAN) for William Berry, a radioman in the Byrd Station winter party of 1961.

Descriptively-named Scallop Ridge is an undulating ridge, 3 nautical miles (6 km) long, forming the southwest portion of the Berry Peaks.

It was named by the Advisory Committee on Antarctic Names after James T. Gallaher, an electrician with the Byrd Station winter party, 1958.

 southeast of the Berry Peaks are Cohen Nunatak and Racine Nunatak.

References 

Mountains of Marie Byrd Land